Neville Bowker  (1918-2005) was the third-highest-scoring fighter ace from Southern Rhodesia during World War II.

References

1918 births
2005 deaths
Recipients of the Distinguished Flying Cross (United Kingdom)
Southern Rhodesian World War II flying aces

External links 
 Neville Bowker at Biplane Fighter Aces from the Second World War